Dateline: Danger! is an American syndicated newspaper comic strip published from November 11, 1968 to March 17, 1974, created and produced by writer John Saunders and artist Al McWilliams. The series, about two intelligence agents working undercover as reporters, co-starred the character Danny Raven, the first African-American lead character of a mainstream comic strip.

Publication history
Inspired by the television series I Spy, the first TV dramatic show to co-star an African-American in a lead role, writer John Saunders and artist Al McWilliams created the adventure comic strip Dateline: Danger! for the Publishers-Hall Syndicate. Introduced as both a daily and a color Sunday strip in November 1968, it similarly was the first in this medium with an African-American lead character, Danny Raven. As in the TV show, the two protagonists were American secret agents who globetrotted to trouble spots under the cover of another profession.

Comics historian Maurice Horn wrote,

The comic strip ran through 1974.

A consultant on the strip was Saunders' father, Allen Saunders, writer of the comic strips Steve Roper and Mike Nomad, Mary Worth and Kerry Drake.

Characters and story

African-American Danny Raven and his Caucasian partner Troy  — an acronym nickname for Theodore Randolph Oscar Young — worked for the agency US Intelligence, which planted them undercover as reporters for a news organization. When the two were not working to stop revolutionary plots in South America, the destabilization of democratic African nations or Cold War tyranny in Eastern Europe, Raven might find himself helping his sister Wendy and younger brother Lee Roy confront hatemonger Robin Jackson, who aimed to instigate race riots through his militant newspaper, The Revolt.

References

External links

American comic strips
African-Americans in comic strips
1968 comics debuts
Comics characters introduced in 1968
1974 comics endings
Fictional reporters
Fictional secret agents and spies
Comics about police officers
Crime comics